The IIHF Women's Pacific Rim Championships were IIHF-sanctioned international ice hockey tournaments held in 1995 and 1996. with teams from Canada, United States, China and Japan. In 1996, the tournament served as a qualifying tournament for the World Championship.

After 1996, the tournament was discontinued as the IIHF World Women Championships were enlarged.

Champions
1995: Canada
 Runner up - USA
1996: Canada
 Runner up - USA

Venues
 Minoru Arena - Richmond, BC
 Logitech Ice Center - San Jose, CA

Participants
 Canada national women's ice hockey team
 China women's national ice hockey team
 Japan women's national ice hockey team
 United States women's national ice hockey team

 
Pac